The Amber Rose Show is an American talk show starring Amber Rose that premiered on July 8, 2016 on VH1. Announced on May 3, 2016, the weekly series features Rose interviewing celebrity guests about various topics related to pop culture, motherhood, and relationships. The show was initially scheduled to premiere on June 17, 2016, but it was later announced it would premiere three weeks later.

"I'm really unapologetic, and I don't give a f--k. I say what I feel so I needed a home like VH1 to not censor myself," Rose describes the show.

The show was not renewed for a second season.

Episodes

References

External links
 
 
 

2010s American television talk shows
2016 American television series debuts
English-language television shows
VH1 original programming